Buster Henderson (1911 – 6 March 1988) was a West Indian cricket umpire. He stood in one Test match, West Indies vs. England, in 1948.

See also
 List of Test cricket umpires

References

1911 births
1988 deaths
Trinidad and Tobago cricket umpires
West Indian Test cricket umpires